is a Japanese footballer who plays for Roasso Kumamoto.

Club statistics
Updated to 23 February 2020.

References

External links
Profile at Roasso Kumamoto
Profile at FC Ryukyu

1992 births
Living people
Chuo University alumni
Association football people from Saitama Prefecture
Japanese footballers
J2 League players
J3 League players
FC Ryukyu players
Roasso Kumamoto players
Kagoshima United FC players
Association football midfielders